Larksville is a borough in Luzerne County, Pennsylvania, United States. The population was 4,216 as of the 2020 census.

History

Larksville was formed from a section of Plymouth Township; it was incorporated as a borough on November 10, 1909. Once known as Blindtown, the community's name was changed to Larksville in honor of Peggy Lark, a former resident.

The borough gained prominence in the late 19th and early 20th centuries as an active anthracite coal mining community, drawing a large portion of its labor force from European immigrants. Larksville was a thriving mining town. Houses were clustered around the collieries. The collieries in the borough were Boston, Loree, Lance, Woodward, and Number 4. At its peak, in 1920, Larksville's population was well over 9,000 people. However, the mining industry in the region collapsed after the 1959 Knox Mine Disaster. The population began to dwindle after its demise. Today, the population is just over 4,000.

Geography

Larksville is located at  (41.258525, -75.927176).

The Susquehanna River makes up Larksville's southeastern border. U.S. Route 11 travels through the southern portion of the borough. Most of the homes and businesses are located in central and southern Larksville. The northern portion of the borough mostly consists of hills, forests, and a few houses. Larksville is part of the Wyoming Valley West School District.

Demographics

As of the census of 2000, there were 4,694 people, 1,808 households, and 1,323 families residing in the borough. The racial makeup of the borough was 98.93% White, 0.28% African American, 0.04% Native American, 0.28% Asian, 0.13% from other races, and 0.34% from two or more races. Hispanic or Latino of any race were 0.70% of the population.

There were 1,808 households, out of which 32.1% had children under the age of 18 living with them, 56.3% were married couples living together, 12.6% had a female householder with no husband present, and 26.8% were non-families. 22.6% of all households were made up of individuals, and 11.7% had someone living alone who was 65 years of age or older. The average household size was 2.59 and the average family size was 3.05.

In the borough the population was spread out, with 23.4% under the age of 18, 7.2% from 18 to 24, 27.2% from 25 to 44, 26.7% from 45 to 64, and 15.5% who were 65 years of age or older. The median age was 40 years. For every 100 females, there were 94.4 males. For every 100 females age 18 and over, there were 91.9 males.

The median income for a household in the borough was $35,467, and the median income for a family was $41,211. Males had a median income of $33,993 versus $21,998 for females. The per capita income for the borough was $16,196. About 10.2% of families and 13.6% of the population were below the poverty line, including 19.1% of those under age 18 and 9.5% of those age 65 or over.

Notable people
April Fronzoni, a field hockey striker from the United States
Bryan Kocis, founder of Cobra Video
Frank O'Connell, Pennsylvania State Representative and State Senator
John Siegal, an American football player 
Joe Skladany, an American football player
Leo Skladany, an American football player

See also
 Coal mining in Plymouth, Pennsylvania.

References

External links

Pennsylvania populated places on the Susquehanna River
Populated places established in 1909
Boroughs in Luzerne County, Pennsylvania
1909 establishments in Pennsylvania